Boomerang was a 24-hour cable television channel owned by Warner Bros. Discovery under its International division. It was a localization of the original United States channel initially launched in 2001 and primarily carried classic Warner Bros. and Hanna-Barbera cartoons. In 2006 it was relaunched as a youth-oriented service. The network would relaunch once more in 2008, now focusing exclusively on teenagers, before becoming the first Boomerang feed in the world to undergo the 2014–15 worldwide rebrand on 28 September 2014.

The channel was replaced by Cartoonito on December 1, 2021 on 6am across Latin America.

History

Launching of Boomerang (2001–06) 
Boomerang was launched on 2 July 2001 with the same graphics and programming from the US variant of the channel. It used to air classic Hanna-Barbera cartoons that had been dropped from the Latin American variant of Cartoon Network back then.

As general children's service (2006–07) 
On 3 April 2006, Boomerang was relaunched as a general children's entertainment network, introducing a logo and on-air branding style identical to that of Pogo (a Turner-owned kids channel in India). Classic cartoons were pushed to the overnight and early morning hours, while the daytime lineup began to feature live-action and animated series; this also encompassed a variation of the Tiny TV block, Mini TV.

As teen-oriented channel (2008–14) 
In January 2008, (June 2008 in Latin America) in the Brazilian and Mexican localized feeds, the channel modified its logo and relaunched again, now solely broadcasting original and third-party-produced shows aimed at teenagers. All classical animation was moved over to Tooncast, a separate 24-hour channel that launched in December of that year. The channel aired some successful blocks, such as Boombox, which consisted of interviews with different artists and featuring live concerts in Latin America, the US, and later, the United Kingdom. On 1 April 2009, the channel launched a mobile service. Outside of Latin America, the channel is an associate member of the Caribbean Cable Cooperative. By mid-2010, the channel's logo was slightly modified. By May 2011, it was the only Boomerang channel in the world that would not air any animated content.

Relaunch as kids and family channel (2014–21) 
On 1 April 2014, cartoon programming returned to the daytime schedule. It was later confirmed that the channel would be part of the worldwide rebrand which took place later on 28 September that year.

Replacement by Cartoonito (2021) 
In October 2021, it was announced on SKY Brasil’s lineup that Boomerang would be replaced by Cartoonito on December 1. Shortly after that, the Argentine pay television service Telered announced the replacement for the rest of Latin America on the same date. And by December 1, 2021, Boomerang was replaced by Cartoonito throughout Latin America.

Programming

See also
 Boomerang (TV network)
 Boomerang (British and Irish TV channel)
 Cartoon Network (Latin American TV channel)
 Cartoonito (brand)
 Cartoonito (Latin American TV channel)
 Tooncast

External links
 Boomerang Latin America Archived official website (Archived on 15 May 2021)

References

 
Defunct television channels
Warner Bros. Discovery Americas
Television channels and stations established in 2001
Television channels and stations disestablished in 2021